Conor Michael Gillaspie (born July 18, 1987) is an American former Major League Baseball (MLB) third baseman who played for the San Francisco Giants, Chicago White Sox and Los Angeles Angels of Anaheim between 2008 and 2017.

Early life
Gillaspie attended Millard North High School in Omaha, Nebraska, where he played baseball, football, and basketball. On the strength of a recommendation from umpire and fellow Nebraskan Bill McGuire, Gillaspie was recruited to play baseball at Wichita State. Gillaspie attended Wichita State University, majoring in geology, from 2006–08. He hit .362 with 58 doubles and 24 home runs over three seasons and was a three-time All-Missouri Valley Conference selection.

Gillaspie played in the Cape Cod Baseball League (CCBL) during the summer of 2007, leading the league in hitting with a .345 batting average. He led the Falmouth Commodores to the championship series against the Yarmouth-Dennis Red Sox, but could not play in the series as he had to return to school. He was named league MVP, and is a member of the CCBL Hall of Fame class of 2019.

Professional career

San Francisco Giants
Gillaspie was drafted by the San Francisco Giants 37th overall in the 2008 Major League Baseball Draft. He played only 24 games in the minors before being called up to the majors on September 6, 2008. He got his first major league hit off Dan Haren on September 16, 2008.

He was the first player in his draft class to make his MLB debut.

Gillaspie spent 2009 at Single-A San Jose and 2010 in Double-A Richmond. He started the 2011 season with Triple-A Fresno. On June 5, 2011, Gillaspie was recalled to the major leagues when Brandon Belt was placed on the 15-day disabled list.  On September 27, 2011, Gillaspie hit an inside-the-park home run against Colorado Rockies pitcher Esmil Rogers for his first Major League home run.

Gillaspie began 2012 with Triple-A Fresno, hitting .362 with 3 HR and 13 RBI in 23 games before being recalled to San Francisco when Pablo Sandoval was placed on the 15-day DL. He got his first hit (a single) of the 2012 season on June 10 against the Texas Rangers.

Chicago White Sox
On February 22, 2013, the San Francisco Giants traded Gillaspie to the Chicago White Sox for minor-league pitcher Jeff Soptic. He became the White Sox primary third baseman in 2013 and 2014. He hit .245 with 13 home runs in 134 games in 2013 and .282 with 7 home runs and 57 RBIs in  130 games in 2014. He was hitting .325 as of July 26, but hit only .209 for the rest of the season. He struggled in 2015 and was designated for assignment on July 19, 2015.

Los Angeles Angels
The White Sox traded Gillaspie to the Los Angeles Angels of Anaheim for cash considerations on July 24, 2015. He was designated for assignment on August 18.

Second stint with the Giants
In February 2016, the San Francisco Giants signed Gillaspie to a minor league deal with an invitation to spring training. He started the season with the Giants' Triple-A affiliate, the Sacramento River Cats of the Pacific Coast League. He was called up on April 22, and spent the season mainly as a bench player for the Giants.  

On October 5, Gillaspie hit a three-run homer in the top of the ninth inning of the 2016 National League Wild Card Game off Jeurys Familia to break a 0–0 tie, helping the Giants defeat the New York Mets 3–0, although the Giants would end up losing the next series to the Chicago Cubs. 

Gillaspie was designated for assignment on August 3, 2017. On August 6, he cleared waivers and returned to the organization to play for the Giants' Triple-A affiliate Sacramento River Cats. He elected free agency on October 2.

Personal
Gillaspie and his wife Amanda have two sons.  Gillaspie's brother, Casey Gillaspie, was drafted in the first round of the 2014 MLB Draft by the Tampa Bay Rays and currently plays for the Kansas City T-Bones Of The American Association of Independent Professional Baseball.

References

External links

1987 births
Living people
Sportspeople from Omaha, Nebraska
Baseball players from Nebraska
Major League Baseball third basemen
San Francisco Giants players
Chicago White Sox players
Los Angeles Angels players
Wichita State Shockers baseball players
Falmouth Commodores players
Arizona League Giants players
Salem-Keizer Volcanoes players
San Jose Giants players
Richmond Flying Squirrels players
Scottsdale Scorpions players
Fresno Grizzlies players
Charlotte Knights players
Sacramento River Cats players